The 2021 season for  was the 19th season in the team's existence, and the third under the current name. The team has been a UCI WorldTeam since 2005, when the tier was first established.

The team's performances resulted in them winning the UCI World Team Ranking for the third time in four years.

Team roster 

Riders who joined the team for the 2021 season

Riders who left the team during or after the 2020 season

Season victories

National, Continental, and World Champions

Notes

References

External links 

 

Deceuninck-Quick Step 2021
2021
Deceuninck-Quick Step 2021